The integrated powerhead demonstrator (IPD) was a U.S. Air Force project in the 1990s and early 2000s run by NASA and the Air Force Research Laboratory (AFRL) to develop a new rocket engine front-end ("powerhead", sometimes also termed a powerpack) that would utilize a full flow staged combustion cycle (FFSCC). The prime contractors were Rocketdyne and Aerojet.

The long-term design goal was to apply the advantages of FFSCC to create a reusable engine with improved life, reliability and performance. The powerhead demonstrator project was to develop a demonstrator design of what could become the front-end for a future engine development project. No subsequent funding was made available by public policymakers, so no full engine design was ever completed.

The turbines were also planned to feature hydrostatic bearings instead of the traditional ball bearings.

More details can be seen at: https://apps.dtic.mil/sti/pdfs/ADA430218.pdf

Videos: 

    Integrated Powerhead Demonstration (IPD) 1:  https://www.youtube.com/watch?v=J__5BmBJDR4

    Integrated Powerhead Demonstration (IPD) 2:  https://www.youtube.com/watch?v=A7Cn_ly87aw

History
On July 19, 2006 Rocketdyne announced that the demonstrator engine front-end had been operated at full capacity.

According to NASA, the Integrated Powerhead Demonstrator project was the first of three potential phases of the Integrated High Payoff Rocket Propulsion Technology Program, which was aimed at demonstrating technologies that double the capability of state-of-the-art cryogenic booster engines. The project's goal in 2005 was to develop a full-flow, hydrogen-fueled, staged combustion rocket engine.

In 2007, Northrop Grumman announced it had received an AFRL contract to design and test a turbopump for liquid hydrogen propellants that could be used for these engines.

Future engine development work beyond the powerhead demo was never funded by the US government, and neither Rocketdyne—nor later Aerojet Rocketdyne after a 2013 merger—chose to pursue such development with their own or other private funding.

References

External links
  (Includes info on tech hurdles and development of IPD.)
  (Test firing news with pictures.)
 

Rocket engines using hydrogen propellant
Rocketdyne engines
Rocket engines using full flow staged combustion cycle
Rocket engines of the United States